KSVA is a Christian radio station licensed to Albuquerque, New Mexico, named after the original Sandia View Academy campus it was founded on, broadcasting on 920 kHz AM.  The station is an owned-and-operated affiliate of LifeTalk Radio.

History
The station began broadcasting in 1947. The station's construction permit originally held the callsign KQEA, which was changed to KOAT on September 1, 1946; the new station initially broadcast on 1450 kHz. In 1951, the station moved to 1240 kHz. In 1955, the station's callsign was changed to KQUE. In 1957, the station moved to 920 kHz. In 1958, the station's callsign was changed to KQEO.

In the 1960s and 1970s KQEO aired a Top 40 format, and was for a time the leading Top 40 station in Albuquerque. In the early 1980s, the station aired an adult contemporary format, and by the mid 1980s the station was airing an oldies format. In the early and mid 1990s KQEO aired a news/talk format. On January 23, 1995, the station's callsign was changed to KHTL. As KHTL, the station aired a "Hot Talk" format.

LifeTalk Radio acquired the station in 2000, in a station swap with Citadel Communications, in which LifeTalk Radio received this station and $5 million in cash, in exchange for Albuquerque's AM 610. On April 17, 2000, the station's callsign was changed to KSVA.

References

External links
KSVA Radio's website
FCC History Cards for KSVA
LifeTalk Radio's website

SVA
Radio stations established in 1947
1947 establishments in New Mexico